Thomas Simart (born October 9, 1987) is a French sprint canoeist who has competed since the late 2000s. He won a two medals at the ICF Canoe Sprint World Championships with a silver (C-1 200: 2010) and a bronze (C-1 4 x 200 m: 2009).

References
Canoe09.ca profile

1987 births
French male canoeists
Living people
ICF Canoe Sprint World Championships medalists in Canadian
Canoeists at the 2016 Summer Olympics
Olympic canoeists of France
European Games competitors for France
Canoeists at the 2015 European Games
Canoeists at the 2019 European Games